Anambé, or more specifically Anambe of Cairari, is a possibly extinct Tupi language spoken in Pará, on the Cairari River in Brazil.  It is being supplanted by Portuguese.

References

External links 

Critically endangered languages
Languages of Brazil
Tupi–Guarani languages